Love...Painfully is a mini album by Korean duo male group J-Walk after they were discharged from army. This mini album is also J-Walk's comeback album under A&G Modes after five years.  Love...Painfully featured a new song, "애써" ("Painfully"). Also included are two previous digital singles: "첫눈오는 날" ("First Snow") and "프라프치노" ("Frappuccino").

J-Walk released "첫눈오는 날" ("First Snow") MV on the November 27 previewing their upcoming winter comeback and had comeback stage on the December 5 broadcast of Mnet’s M! Countdown. On the December 4, They released the video teaser for their main track “Strive” from their upcoming mini-album, “Love…Painfully.” “Strive” features zizo and Bumkey and will be a more dramatic ballad than “First Day of Snow.” The music video for this breaking up song will star J-Walk’s Jwang Soo Won and actress Cheon Lee Seul. The music video for main track “Strive” and the four track mini album “Love…Painfully” released on December 12.

Track listing

References

2013 albums
J-Walk (South Korean band) albums